Antônio Mariano de Oliveira (April 28, 1857 – January 19, 1937) was a Brazilian poet, pharmacist and professor. He is better known by his pen name Alberto de Oliveira.

Alongside Olavo Bilac and Raimundo Correia, he comprised the Brazilian "Parnassian Triad".

He founded and occupied the 8th chair of the Brazilian Academy of Letters from 1897 until his death in 1937.

References

External links 
Jornal de Poesia bio (In Portuguese)
Brazilian Embassy in Ottawa
Fundamentos Modernos das Poesias de Alberto de Oliveira (doctoral thesis in Portuguese)

1859 births
1937 deaths
19th-century Brazilian poets
Brazilian male poets
People from Rio de Janeiro (state)
Members of the Brazilian Academy of Letters
20th-century Brazilian poets
19th-century Brazilian male writers
20th-century Brazilian male writers